Claude Borelli (1934–1960) was a French film actress. During the 1950s she performed in a number of films including the 1955 German film Hello, My Name is Cox in which she co-starred with Johannes Heesters. She died in an accident at the age of twenty six after falling through the window of her apartment, on the third floor, while trying to catch her cat which had escaped.

She should not be confused with male child actor of the same name, active during the early 1930s.

Selected filmography
 The Most Beautiful Girl in the World (1951) 
 When You Read This Letter (1953)
 This Man Is Dangerous (1953)
 Les Intrigantes (1954)
 Hello, My Name is Cox (1955)
 Les Truands (1956)

References

Bibliography
 Goble, Alan. The Complete Index to Literary Sources in Film. Walter de Gruyter, 1999.

External links

1934 births
1960 deaths
French stage actresses
French film actresses
20th-century French women
Accidental deaths in France